The Russian Council of Muftis is a religious group representing the Muslim community of Russia. It was founded on 2 July 1996. The Chairman of the Council is the spiritual leader of the Muslims of Russia.

The Council is responsible for allocating the slots for the Hajj assigned to Russia. In 2012, it demanded a rise in the number of mosques in Moscow, saying they should at least double.

References

External links
 

1996 establishments in Russia
Islamic organizations based in Russia
Islamic organizations established in 1996